Baze is a surname. Notable people with the surname include:

Gary Baze (born 1955), American jockey
Grant Baze (1943-2009), American bridge player
Michael C. Baze (born 1987), American jockey
Ralph Baze (21st century), American murderer
Russell Baze (born 1958), American jockey
Tyler Baze (born 1982), American jockey
Winnie Baze (1914−2006), American football player

See also
Baize (disambiguation)
Bays (disambiguation)
Nathaniel "Baze" Bazile
Baze Senior Knockout Teams (1994-2018), North American Bridge championship